Peter Mark Brant Jr. (born December 30, 1993) is an American socialite and model.

Life and career
Peter Mark Brant Jr. was born December 30, 1993, and raised in Greenwich, Connecticut. Brant is the son of businessman and art collector Peter M. Brant and model Stephanie Seymour. His paternal grandparents were Bulgarian Jewish immigrants.

In 2011, Brant publicly came out as gay.

In 2014, Brant was quoted in a Harper's Bazaar profile of him, his brother Harry and mother, Stephanie, about enjoying his clan's notoriety, "We had to do a report about our parents: where they were born, what they did, and all that. Everyone else had to do theirs as homework, but I finished mine before class ended using Wikipedia."

Brant attended Bard College in Annandale-on-Hudson, New York.

In 2015, Peter along with his younger brother Harry, in collaboration with Mac Cosmetics, launched a unisex cosmetics line aimed at the Gender fluid youth movement.

In March 2016, Brant was arrested at John F. Kennedy International Airport after a “drunken ruckus”, during which he assaulted a police officer. Brant's lawyer referred to him as an “idiot.”

In January 2021 Peter Jr.'s brother, Harry age 24, died of accidental prescription drug overdose.

References

1993 births
Living people
Male models from New York (state)
American people of Bulgarian-Jewish descent
American people of Romanian-Jewish descent
American socialites
Models from New York City
People from Greenwich, Connecticut
Gay models
Fashion influencers
Male bloggers
American people of Italian descent
American people of Croatian descent
American people of Slovenian descent
American people of English descent
American people of French descent
American people of German descent
American people of Scottish descent
American people of Welsh descent